Soyaux Angoulême XV Charente is a French rugby union club from Angoulême, currently playing in the second level of the country's professional rugby system, Pro D2.

The team plays in violet and purple shirts, and play their home matches at the 8000-capacity Stade Chanzy in Angoulême.

History

The team origins dates back to 15 February 1910, when a multi-sports organisation called Sporting Club d'Angoulême was formed. The rugby team was part of this organisation until 2003, when it broke away to become an independent entity, called Sporting Club d'Angoulême Rugby. In 2010, the team merged with Rugby Club Soyaux to become Soyaux Angoulême XV Charente.

SA XV Charente's first season after the merger was in the Fédérale 3 in 2010–2011 and they won the competition to gain promotion to Fédérale 2. In their third season at that level in 2013–14, they again won their league (winning all 25 of their matches during the season) to gain promotion to Fédérale 1. In only their second season in that competition, they won promotion to the second tier of French rugby, Rugby Pro D2 for the first time in their history, where they would compete in the 2016–2017 season.

Current standings

Current squad
The Soyaux Angouleme squad for the 2020–21 season is:

See also

 List of rugby union clubs in France

References

External links
 Official website

French rugby union clubs
Sport in Charente